This is a list of cricketers who have played matches for the Habib Bank Limited cricket team.

Players 

 Aamer Sohail
 Abbas Afridi
 Abdul Qadir
 Abdur Rehman
 Aftab Alam
 Ahmed Shehzad
 Ahsan Jamil
 Ahsan Raza
 Akram Raza
 Ali Shafiq
 Amad Butt
 Anwar Miandad
 Asad Shafiq
 Asim Kamal
 Azhar Mahmood
 Bilal Shafayat
 Danish Kaneria
 Ehsan Adil 2012-present
 Faheem Ashraf
 Haider Rameez
 Hasan Raza
 Hasan Raza
 Imam-ul-Haq
 Imran Farhat
 Israr-ul-Haq
 Jamal Anwar
 Javed Miandad
 Kabir Khan
 Kamran Hussain
 Khurram Shehzad
 Rafatullah Mohmand
 Rameez Aziz
 Mohsin Khan
 Naeem Khan
 Nauman Shabbir
 Saad Khan
 Shahid Afridi
 Saleem Elahi
 Saleem Malik
 Salman Afridi
 Sajjad Ali
 Shaukat Mirza
 Tahir Rasheed
 Taufeeq Umar
 Umar Gul
 Waheed Mirza
 Yamin Ahmadzai
 Younis Khan
 Zohaib Khan

References 

Lists of Pakistani cricketers
Habib Bank Limited cricketers